Kerala lentiginosa is a species of moth of the family Nolidae. It is found in Taiwan.

The wingspan is 31–38 mm.

References

Moths described in 1914
Nolidae
Moths of Taiwan